Shelley Leopold Laurence Scarlett, 5th Baron Abinger (1 April 1872 – 23 May 1917) was a British peer and military officer.

Scarlett was the son of Lieutenant Colonel Leopold James Yorke Campbell Scarlett, and a great-grandson of the 1st Baron Abinger. His mother had been adopted by Percy Florence Shelley, son of Mary and Percy Bysshe Shelley.

Career
Scarlett served as an Honorary Attaché in Stockholm from 1897 to 1899.

Scarlett succeeded his second cousin as the 5th Baron Abinger in 1903. In 1904, a Royal Warrant of Precedence was issued, which allowed Scarlett's siblings (Robert, Hugh, Ruth, Percy, and Leopold) to be styled The Honourable.

Scarlett served in the First World War from 1914, holding the rank of captain and honorary major in the 3rd Battalion, Bedfordshire Regiment. On 17 October 1915, Scarlett was awarded a temporary commission in the Royal Naval Volunteer Reserve with the honorary rank of commander. Serving under the Director of the Intelligence Division, he ran intelligence gathering operations in the south of neutral Spain.

Scarlett was serving at the Admiralty at the time of his death in May 1917, aged 45. He was buried at Brookwood Cemetery.

Marriage

Scarlett married Lila Lucy Catherine Mary Geijer (née White), daughter of Sir William Arthur White, in 1899. They had no children, and he was succeeded as Lord Abinger by his brother Robert.

References

External links

 

1872 births
1917 deaths
Bedfordshire and Hertfordshire Regiment officers
British military personnel killed in World War I
Royal Navy officers of World War I
Burials at Brookwood Cemetery
Shelley
British Army personnel of World War I
Royal Naval Volunteer Reserve personnel of World War I